Asunta Yong Fang Basterra Porto (born Fang Yong; 30 September 2000 – 21 September 2013) was a Chinese-born Spanish girl whose body was found in Teo, A Coruña, Galicia, Spain, on 22 September 2013, shortly before her thirteenth birthday. The coroner determined she had died by asphyxiation, and had been given at least twenty-seven Lorazepam pills on the day of her death, more than nine times a high dosage amount for an adult. The investigation into the death became known as the Asunta Basterra case.

Asunta's adoptive parents, Alfonso Basterra and Rosario Porto, were found guilty of her murder on 30 October 2015. According to court documents, the couple periodically drugged their daughter with Lorazepam for three months and finally asphyxiated her before disposing of her body. The parents, who maintained their innocence, were sentenced to eighteen years in prison.

The case has attracted widespread media interest in Spain and around the world, as well as a "statement of concern" from the Chinese Ministry of Foreign Affairs. A four-part documentary series about the case debuted in 2017 and was made available internationally on Netflix in 2019.

Background 
Asunta Basterra was born Fang Yong in 2000 in Yongzhou, Hunan, China. At nine months old she was adopted by Alfonso Basterra Camporro (b. 1964) and Maria del Rosario Porto Ortega (b. 1969), an affluent Spanish couple from Santiago de Compostela, Galicia. Asunta was the first Chinese child to be adopted in the city of Santiago and one of the first in all of Galicia. Asunta was said to have been a gifted child, being a talented ballet dancer, violinist, and piano player who skipped a year in school. She was also very close to her maternal grandparents, who died the year before her death.

Asunta's adoptive mother, Rosario Porto, came from a prominent Galician family. Her father, lawyer Francisco Porto Mella (d. 2012), was an honorary consul of France. Her mother, María del Socorro Ortega (died 2011), was a highly regarded university lecturer of art history. Porto studied law at the University of Santiago de Compostela and practiced at her father's firm after graduation. She also claimed to have attended the London High School of Law in England, which The Guardian confirmed does not exist. In 1997 she was appointed consul of France, inheriting the role from her father.

Porto met journalist Alfonso Basterra, a native of Bilbao, in 1990. The two married in 1996 and lived in a large flat that had been given to Porto by her parents. In 2001 they travelled to China and adopted 9-month-old Asunta from the Guiyang Welfare Institute. In January 2013 the couple separated and Basterra moved to an apartment around the corner from the family flat. Asunta split her time between the two homes, walking the short distance between them.

Death and investigation 
Asunta was first reported missing by her parents at 10:17pm on Saturday 21 September, 2013. They had eaten lunch together at her father's home that afternoon. Asunta was seen on a bank's security camera at 2pm walking to her father's house, and appeared on that same security camera at 5:21pm returning home to her mother's flat. Porto was seen on the same security camera walking home at 5:28pm. 

Porto initially told investigators that she had left home at around 7pm, leaving Asunta at home doing homework. She said that she had driven alone to the family's country house in Teo, located about twenty minutes outside Santiago, and that when she returned to her apartment at 9:30 Asunta was missing. Porto said that she called Asunta's father and many of her friends, none of whom had seen her.

Investigators later recovered CCTV video footage of Porto and Asunta at a gas station on the route toward Teo at 6:20pm, contradicting Porto's timeline and story that she had left Asunta home that afternoon. After being made aware of the video Porto changed her story, this time saying that Asunta had briefly come with her to the country house, but that she quickly took her back to Santiago because the child had wanted to do homework. Porto claimed that after dropping Asunta off at home, she went to a sporting goods store to buy an item for Asunta's ballet class, but did not go in after realizing that she had left her purse in Teo. Porto claimed she then returned to the country house in Teo to retrieve her purse, then went to a gas station but did not fill her tank because she realized she did not have her discount card.

Police examined the video footage from thirty-three security cameras around Santiago and found no video of Porto's car on any of the roads she claimed to have driven on that afternoon. The police in charge of the case came to believe that Porto and Asunta arrived at their house in Teo just after 6pm, and that Porto left the house around 9pm.

Asunta's body was discovered in the early morning hours of 22 September 2013, at around 1am, on the side of a small mountain road in Teo, a few kilometers away from the country house. Not long after, Porto and investigators went together to the country house, where Porto was told not to touch anything since the house could be a crime scene. Porto told police that she needed to use the bathroom; an officer followed her upstairs, and found her attempting to retrieve the contents of a wastepaper bin in the bedroom. The bin contained a piece of the same type of orange rope that Asunta's limbs had been tied with when her body was found. Forensic scientists were ultimately unable to determine whether or not the discarded piece had come from the same roll used in the murder.

The investigation into Asunta's death was named Operación Nenúfar ("Operation Water Lily") by detectives, who noted that in the moonlight, the girl's body in her white shirt appeared to be floating above the ground like a flower.

Documentary 
A four-part documentary about the case, Lo que la verdad esconde: Caso Asunta ("What the Truth Hides: The Asunta Case"), directed by Elías León Siminiani, premiered on Spanish television on 24 May 2017. It was considered a landmark documentary in Spain, which historically has eschewed the true crime genre. It became available internationally on Netflix in February 2019.

See also
José Bretón case, murder of siblings by their father in Andalusia
Anna and Olivia case, murder of siblings by their father in Canary Islands
Alcàsser Girls, high-profile murder case of Spanish girls in Valencia
Typhaine case, a case of child abuse and murder that occurred in France in 2009

References 

2013 in Galicia (Spain)
2013 murders in Spain
Child abuse resulting in death
Deaths by person in Spain
Deaths from asphyxiation
Female murder victims
Filicides
Incidents of violence against girls
Infanticide
People murdered in Spain
September 2013 crimes in Europe
September 2013 events in Europe
Spanish murder victims
Violence against women in Spain